Pagopedilum is a genus of grasshopers in the subfamily Porthetinae, with species found in the south of Africa.

Species 

The following species are recognised in the genus Pagopedilum:

 Pagopedilum angusticornis (Dirsh, 1958)
 Pagopedilum bradyanum (Saussure, 1887)
 Pagopedilum brevis (Walker, 1870)
 Pagopedilum giliomeei (Johnsen, 1990)
 Pagopedilum martini Bolívar, 1915
 Pagopedilum minor (Dirsh, 1958)
 Pagopedilum sabulosum (Stål, 1875)
 Pagopedilum sordidum (Walker, 1870)
 Pagopedilum subcruciatum Karsch, 1896

References 

Pamphagidae